This is a list of towns and boroughs in Pennsylvania. There are currently 956 municipalities classified as boroughs and 1 classified as a town in Pennsylvania. Unlike other forms of municipalities in Pennsylvania, boroughs and towns are not classified according to population.

Boroughs designated in the table below with a dagger (†) are home rule municipalities and are also found in the List of Pennsylvania municipalities and counties with home rule charters, optional charters, or optional plans. The state classifies these as boroughs for certain purposes, even though they do not operate under the Borough Code in Pennsylvania Law and may not contain the word "Borough" in their corporate names. Note that home rule municipalities that are styled as towns but classified as townships are not included in this list.

In addition, two boroughs, Quakertown and Weatherly, have adopted optional plans, which allow them to change their form of local government but do not significantly change those boroughs' relationships with the state.

Town

Boroughs

† Home rule municipality

See also
List of municipalities in Pennsylvania
List of cities in Pennsylvania
List of counties in Pennsylvania
List of Pennsylvania Municipalities and Counties with Home Rule Charters, Optional Charters, or Optional Plans
List of townships in Pennsylvania
List of cities and boroughs in Pennsylvania by population

Pennsylvania geography-related lists
Pennsylvania